Kineo Computer Aided Motion ("Kineo CAM") was a computer software company based in Toulouse, France, that was awarded the European ICT Prize in 2007 in Hannover, Germany, for KineoWorks, its automatic motion planning, path planning and pathfinding technology. It was acquired by Siemens Digital Industries Software in 2012.

KineoWorks is a core software component dedicated to motion planning that enables automatic motion of any mechanical system or virtual artifact in a 3D environment, ensuring collision avoidance and respecting kinematic constraints.

Kineo Collision Detector (KCD) is a collision detection software library with an object-oriented API. It is included in KineoWorks and exists also as a standalone library. It works with a hierarchical architecture of heterogeneous data types based on composite design pattern and is especially suited for large 3D models.

The Kineo CAM main market is PLM, DMU and CADCAM systems, robotics and coordinate-measuring machines (CMM).

History

Incorporated in December 2000, Kineo CAM benefited from a 15-year research legacy from the LAAS and CNRS.

The company was acquired by Siemens Digital Industries Software on October 8, 2012.

Awards

2000: Winner of the national contest of innovation from French Ministry of Research and Technology
2005: Kineo CAM receives IEEE and IFR Innovation Award for Outstanding Achievements in Commercializing Innovative Robot and Automation Technology
2006: Awarded by Daratech the title of emerging technology at the DaratechSUMMIT2006 with eight other innovative American companies
2007: Innovation ICT Prize from the European Commission and the European Council of Applied Sciences, Technologies and Engineering
2007: Innovation and International award from Regional council of Midi-Pyrénées

External links

LAAS-CNRS

French companies established in 2000
French companies disestablished in 2012
Software companies established in 2000
Software companies disestablished in 2012
Defunct software companies of France
Companies based in Toulouse
2012 mergers and acquisitions